Like the Exorcist, but More Breakdancing is the first full-length album by Indiana indie rock band Murder by Death.
It was released in June 2002 by Eyeball Records.

Track listing

References

2002 debut albums
Murder by Death (band) albums